Liu Junwei (born 1 May 1976 in Shenyang) is a Chinese football manager and former football player.

Playing career
Liu Junwei began his professional football career in 1997 when he was promoted to Bayi Football Team's first team squad. He moved to Chinese Super League side Qingdao Jonoon after Bayi dissolved in 2004. In February 2008, he was loaned to China League One side Nanchang Bayi for one season with the fee of ¥300,000. He was named as the club's captain in the 2008 league season. He transferred to Nanchang Bayi on 25 February 2009. He announced his retirement at the end of 2010 league season.

Management career
Liu became the assistant and fitness coach of Nanchang Bayi after his retirement. He followed the club to move to Shanghai and changed their name as Shanghai Shenxin in 2012. On 13 April 2015, Liu was appointed as the new manager of Shanghai Shenxin after Guo Guangqi resigned. He left the club at the end of the season after Shanghai Shenxin finished the last of the league and Relegated to China League One. In December 2015, Liu joined League One side Wuhan Zall and became their assistant coach. He left Wuhan in June 2016 after Ciro Ferrara became the manager of the club. Liu was appointed as the manager of China League Two club Suzhou Dongwu in February 2019. He left the club in 2020.

Personal life
Liu married former China women's national basketball team captain Bai Hua on 25 July 2004.

References

Living people
1976 births
Chinese footballers
Chinese football managers
Qingdao Hainiu F.C. (1990) players
Shanghai Shenxin F.C. players
Footballers from Shenyang
Chinese Super League players
China League One players
Chinese Super League managers
Shanghai Shenxin F.C. managers
Association football defenders
Shanghai Shenxin F.C. non-playing staff